(January 19, 1872 – May 21, 1925) was a Japanese agricultural scientist, famous in Japan as the guardian of Hachikō, a devoted Akita dog.

Life and career
Ueno was born on January 19, 1872, in Hisai-shi (present-day Tsu), Mie Prefecture. In 1895, he graduated from Tokyo Imperial University's agriculture department, and in the same year, he entered graduate school to study agricultural engineering and farm implement research. He finished his graduate work on July 10, 1900, and he began teaching at Tokyo Imperial University, as an assistant professor. In 1902, he became an associate professor in the agricultural university.

He made efforts toward the education of technical experts in the field of arable land readjustment: studying drainage and reclamation engineering. Technology of the arable land readjustment was used for the imperial capital revival, after the 1923 Great Kantō earthquake.

In 1916, he became Professor of Imperial University at the university agriculture department, and he took charge of the agricultural engineering lecture. He provided a program of agricultural engineering specialization in the agriculture department. Ueno died of a cerebral hemorrhage on May 21, 1925, while he was giving a lecture. Ueno was later buried at Aoyama Cemetery.

Hachikō

His dog, Hachikō, an Akita, became famous for waiting for him every day at the train station even though he had already died. The dog continued to do so until his own death, nine years later. Hachikō is buried beside Ueno in Aoyama Cemetery, Tokyo, Japan. A bronze statue commemorating the dog was set up in front of the Shibuya Station in 1934 a year before his death (March 8, 1935). His story has been the subject of numerous books and films.

On March 9, 2015, the Faculty of Agriculture of the University of Tokyo unveiled a bronze statue depicting Ueno returning to meet Hachikō at the University of Tokyo, Japan. The statue was sculpted by Tsutomo Ueda from Nagoya and depicts a very excited Hachikō jumping up to greet his master at the end of a workday. Ueno is dressed in a hat, suit, and trench coat, with his briefcase placed on the ground. Hachikō wears a studded harness as seen in his last photos.

Yaeko Sakano
, more often referred as Yaeko Ueno, was an unmarried partner to Hidesaburō Ueno for about 10 years until his death in 1925. Hachikō was reported to have shown great happiness and affection toward her whenever she came to visit him. Yaeko died on 30 April 1961 at the age of 76 and despite her request to her family members to be buried with her late partner, she was buried at a temple in Taitō, further away from Ueno's grave. Her record was later found by Sho Shiozawa, the professor of the University of Tokyo in 2013, who was also the president of the Japanese Society of Irrigation, Drainage and Rural Engineering, which manages Ueno's grave at Aoyama Cemetery.

On November 10, 2013, which marked the 90th anniversary of the Birth of Hachikō, Sho Shiozawa and Keita Matsui, a curator of the Shibuya Folk and Literary Shirane Memorial Museum, felt the need that Yaeko be buried together with Ueno and Hachikō. Shiozawa also went on as one of the organizers involved with the creation of bronze statue of Hachikō and Ueno which was later unveiled on the grounds of the University of Tokyo on the 80th anniversary of Hachikō's death on March 9, 2015. Although it had the consent of both the Ueno and Sakano families, the process took two years due to regulations and bureaucracy.

Reunion of Hachikō's family
On 19 May 2016, during a ceremony at the Aoyama Cemetery attended by members of the Ueno and Sakano families, some of the ashes of Yaeko Sakano were buried with Ueno and Hachikō. Her name and the date of her death were inscribed on the side of Ueno's tombstone, thus reuniting Hachikō's family.

See also

Hachi: A Dog's Tale
Hachikō Monogatari

Notes

Further reading

 

1871 births
1925 deaths
 Japanese agricultural scientists
 University of Tokyo alumni
 People from Mie Prefecture
Academic staff of the University of Tokyo